Here are lists of schools which only admit girls, or those which only admit girls at certain levels/years/grades, or those which separate students by gender at certain points (such as the Diamond Schools model), by country.

Antigua and Barbuda
 Christ the King High School (Antigua)

Australia

Azerbaijan
 Former
 Empress Alexandra Russian Muslim Boarding School for Girls

Bahrain
Note that government schools in this country are separated by gender.

 AAli Intermediate Girls
 AAli Primary Girls
 Ain Jaloot Primary Girls
 Aisha Umm Al-Moemeneen Primary Girls
 Al Ahad Al zaher Secondary Girls
 Al Estiqlal Secondary Girls
 Al Marefa Secondary Girls
 Al Wafaa Secondary Girls
 Al-Andalus Primary Girls
 Al-Belad Al-Qadeem Primary Girls
 Al-Budaiyya Primary Intermediate Girls
 Al-Busaiteen Primary Girls
 Al-Daih Primary Intermediate Girls
 Al-Dair Primary Intermediate Girls
 Al-Duraz Intermediate Girls
 Al-Duraz Primary Girls
 Al-Hidd Intermediate Girls
 Al-Hidd Secondary Girls
 Al-Hunaineya Primary Girls
 Al-Khaleej Al-Arabi Primary Intermediate Girls
 Al-Khansa Primary Girls
 Al-Manhal Primary Girls
 Al-Muharraq Primary Girls
 Al-Nabeeh Saleh Primary Girls
 Al-Noor Secondary Girls
 Al-Nuzha Primary Girls
 Al-Orouba Primary Girls
 Al-Qadsiah Primary Girls
 Al-Qayrawan Intermediate Girls
 Al-Qudes Primary Girls
 Al-Rawdha Primary Girls
 Al-Safa Primary Girls
 Al-Salam Primary Girls
 Al-Sanabis Intermediate Girls
 Al-Sanabis Primary Girls
 Al-Sehlah Primary Girls
 Al-Shorooq Secondary Girls
 Al-Tadamon Secondary Girls
 Al-Zallaq Primary Intermediate Girls
 Al-nowaidrat Primary Girls
 Almustaqbal Primary Girls
 Aminah Bint Wahab Primary Girls
 Arad Intermediate Girls
 Arad Primary Girls
 Asma That Alnetaqain Primary Girls
 Bahrain Vocational Secondary
 Bait Al-Hekmah Primary Girls
 Balqees Primary Girls
 Buri Primary Girls
 Busaiteen Intermediate Girls
 Dr.Ghazi Al Gusaybi Secondary Girls
 East Riffa Intermediate Girls
 East Riffa Primary Girls
 Fatima Bint Alkhattab Primary Girls
 Fatima Bint Asad Primary Girls
 Gharnata Primary Girls
 Hafsa Um Almoumineen Primary Girls
 Hajer Primary Girls
 Halima Al-Saadeyya Intermediate Girls
 Hamad Town Intermediate Girls
 Hamad Town Primary Girls
 Hamad Town Secondary Girls
 Isa Town Intermediate Girls
 Isa Town Secondary Girls
 Jidhafs Secondary Girls
 Karrana Primary Girls
 Khadija Al-Kubra Intermediate Girls
 Khawlah Secondary Girls
 Malkiya Primary Intermediate Girls
 Mariam Bint Omran Primary Girls
 Muharraq Secondary Girls
 Nasiba Bint Kaab Primary Girls
 Omaima Bint Al Noaman Secondary Girls
 Qurtoba Intermediate Girls
 Rabiaa Al-Adaweyia Primary Girls
 Ruqaya Primary Girls
 Saar Primary Girls
 Saar Secondary Girls
 Saba Primary Girls
 Safeyia Bint Abdulmuttalib Primary Girls
 Safrah Primary Intermediate Girls
 Sakeena Bint Al-Hussain Primary Girls
 Salmabad Primary Girls
 Sanad Primary Girls
 Shahrakkan Primary Girls
 Shaikha Moza Bint Hamad Al Khalifa Intermediate Girls
 Shaikha Moza Bint Hamad Al Khalifa Primary Girls
 Shaikha Moza Bint Hamad Al Khalifa Secondary Girls
 Sitra Intermediate Girls
 Sitra Primary Girls
 Sitra Secondary Girls
 Sumayia Primary Girls
 Tubli Primary Girls
 Tulaitela Primary Girls
 Um Al-Qura Primary Intermediate Girls
 Um Ayman Primary Girls
 Um Kalthoom Intermediate Girls
 Um Salama Intermediate Secondary Girls
 West Rifaa Secondary Girls
 West Riffa Intermediate Girls
 West Riffa Primary Girls
 Yathreb Intermediate Girls
 Zainab Intermediate Girls
 Zannoobia Intermediate Girls

Bangladesh
 Chittagong Division
 Agrabad Balika Bidyalay
 Aparnacharan City Corporation Girls' High School
 Bangladesh Mahila Samiti Girls' High School & College
 Chatkhil Government Girls' High School
 Feni Girls' Cadet College
 Dr. Khastagir Government Girls' High School (Chittagong)
 Nawab Faizunnesa Government Girls' High School (Comilla)
 Noakhali Government Girls' High School
 Silver Bells Kindergarten & Girls' High School
 Dhaka Division
 Azimpur Girls' High School (Dhaka)
 Bottomley Home Girls' High School
 Holy Cross Girls' High School (Dhaka)
 Holy Cross College, Dhaka
 Kamrunnessa Government Girls High School
 St. Francis Xavier's Girls' High School
 Tejgaon Government Girls' High School
 Viqarunnisa Noon School and College
 Khulna Division
 Magura Govt. Girls' High School
 Manirampur Government Girls' High School
 Mymensingh Division
 Mymensingh Girls' Cadet College
 Vidyamoyee Govt. Girls' High School (Mymensingh)
 Rajshahi Division
 Joypurhat Girls' Cadet College
 Mohanpur Government Girls High School
 Natore Government Girls' High School
 Pabna Government Girls' High School
 Rangpur Division
 Debiganj Alodini Government Girls High School
 Debiganj Girls High School
 Dinajpur Government Girls' High School

Bermuda

 Bermuda High School

Brunei
 Pengiran Anak Puteri Hajah Masna Secondary School
 Raja Isteri Girls' High School
 Raja Isteri Pengiran Anak Hajah Saleha Girls' Secondary Arabic Religious School
 Sufri Bolkiah Secondary School

Cameroon
 Our Lady of Lourdes College Mankon
 Saker Baptist College

Canada

Alberta
 Calgary Girls' School

British Columbia
Vancouver
Crofton House School
York House School
Little Flower Academy
Victoria
St. Margaret's School

Manitoba
 Balmoral Hall School

Nova Scotia
 Former
 Holy Angels High School

Ontario
 Brampton
 Holy Name of Mary Catholic Secondary School
 Mississauga
 Holy Name of Mary College School
 Ottawa
 Elmwood School
 Toronto
 Bishop Strachan School
 Branksome Hall
 Havergal College
 Hawthorn School for Girls
 The Linden School
 Madonna Catholic Secondary School
 Notre Dame High School
 St. Joseph's College School
 St. Joseph's Morrow Park Catholic Secondary School
 St. Clement's School

Former:
 St. Joseph Islington High School, merged into Michael Power/St. Joseph High School

Quebec
 Gatineau (Ottawa area)
 Collège Saint-Joseph de Hull
 Montreal
 Trafalgar School for Girls

China
This list covers Mainland China only. For Hong Kong and Macau see their respective lists. For schools in the Taiwan area, including the island of Taiwan, go to "Taiwan (Republic of China)"
 Shanghai No. 3 Girls' High School
 Phoenix School for Girls
 Zhuhai Xiang Zhang Secondary School (formerly Zhuhai Girls' Middle School)
 Beijing EBSNU HuaXia Girls' Middle School (北京师范大学实验华夏女子中学)

Former:
 No. 4 Girls' School of Beijing (now Beijing Chen Jing Lun High School)
 McTyeire School
 St. Mary's Hall, Shanghai
 Shanghai No. 2 High School was once Shanghai No. 2 Girls' High School
 Virginia School for Girls
 Girls' High School Attached to Beijing Normal University, now Experimental High School Attached to Beijing Normal University

Cyprus
 Former
 American Academy for Girls (now American Academy Nicosia)

Denmark
 Now coeducational
 Ingrid Jespersens Gymnasieskole
 Nørre Gymnasium
 N. Zahle's School

 Former
 Døtreskolen af 1791
 J. Cl. Todes Døtreskole
 Madam Lindes Institut

Egypt
 Deutsche Schule der Borromäerinnen Alexandria
 Deutsche Schule der Borromäerinnen Kairo
 El Nasr Girls' College
 Institution Sainte Jeanne-Antide
 Manar English Girls School

Finland
 Former
 Svenska fruntimmersskolan i Helsingfors (Helsinki)
 Svenska fruntimmersskolan i Åbo (Turku)
 Fruntimmersskolan i Viborg (now in Russian territory)

Germany
 Hesse
 Maria-Ward-Schule, Bad Homburg
 North Rhine-Westphalia
 Erzbischöfliche Liebfrauenschule Bonn
 
 Former
 Bismarck-Oberlyzeum (Königsberg, now Kaliningrad in Russia)
 Goethe-Oberlyzeum (Königsberg)
 Hufen-Oberlyzeum (Königsberg)
 Königin-Luise-Schule (Königsberg)
 Körte-Oberlyzeum
 Landfrauenschule Metgethen
 Lette-Verein
 Ostpreußische Mädchengewerbeschule (Königsberg)
 Victoria-Lyzeum

Ghana
 Ashanti Region
 Adventist Girls High School
 Kumasi Girls Senior High School
 Serwaa Nyarko Girls' Senior High School
 St. Louis Senior High School (Ghana)
 St. Monica's Senior High School
 T.I. Ahmadiyya Girls Senior High School, Asokore
 Yaa Asantewaa Secondary School
 Brong-Afaho Region
 Notre Dame High School (Ghana)
 OLA Girls Senior High School (Kenyasi)
 Central Region
 Holy Child High School, Ghana
 Mfantsiman Girls' Secondary School
 Wesley Girls' Senior High School
 Eastern Region
 Aburi Girls' Senior High School
 Methodist Girls Senior High School
 Methodist Girls' High School (Mamfe)
 St Roses Senior High (Akwatia)
 Greater Accra Region
 Accra Girls Senior High School
 African Science Academy
 St Mary's Senior High School (Ghana)
 Northern Region
 Gambaga Girls Senior High School
 Tamale Girls Secondary School
 Upper East Region
 Bolgatanga Girls Senior High School
 Upper West Region
 St. Francis Girls' Senior High School
 Volta Region
 Mawuko Girls Senior High School
 OLA Girls Senior High School (Ho)
 Western Region
 Ahantaman Girls Senior High School
 Archbishop Porter Girls Secondary School
 Axim Girls Senior High School

 Now coeducational
 Queen of Apostles Boarding School, Elmina

Gibraltar

Now coeducational:
 Westside School, Gibraltar

Guam

 Academy of Our Lady of Guam

 Former girls' schools
 Notre Dame High School (Guam) (became coeducational in 1995)

Guernsey

 Ladies' College, Guernsey

Hong Kong

India

Iran
Since the Iranian Revolution government schools have been divided by gender
 Toloo High School
 Tehran Farzanegan School
 Tehran International School has a separate girls' campus
 Former
 Refah School

Iraq
 Baghdad
 Amil High School for Girls
 Baghdad High School for Girls
 Tigris Secondary School for Girls

Al Mutamayizeen Secondary has girls' schools.

Ireland (Republic of)
 Connacht
 Mercy College, Sligo
 Mount St. Michaels
 Ursuline College Sligo
 Leinster
 Alexandra College
 Coláiste Íosagáin
 Loreto Abbey, Dalkey
 Loreto College, Swords
 Loreto Secondary School, Kilkenny
 Loreto Secondary School, Navan
 Manor House School, Raheny
 Mercy College (Dublin)
 Mount Anville Secondary School
 Muckross Park College
 Our Lady's College, Greenhills
 Presentation Secondary School, Kilkenny
 Sancta Maria College, Rathfarnham
 St Leo's College, Carlow
 St Louis Secondary School, Dundalk
 St Louis High School, Rathmines
 St Joseph's Secondary School, Navan
 St Wolstan's Community School
 Munster
 Ard Scoil na nDéise
 Laurel Hill Coláiste
 St Angela's College, Cork
 St Patricks Girls Primary
 Ulster
 Loreto Convent Secondary School, Letterkenny
 Former girls' schools
 The Diocesan School for Girls - merged into The High School, Dublin in 1974
 Collegiate School Celbridge

Israel
 Schmidt's Girls College, which is in East Jerusalem, under Israeli control and politically disputed between Israel and Palestine

Italy
Former
 L'Istituto Statale della Ss. Annunziata

Jamaica
 Hampton School
 Holy Childhood High
 Immaculate Conception High School
 Marymount High School
 Queen's School
 Westwood High School

Japan

Jersey

 Beaulieu Convent School
 Jersey College for Girls

Jordan
Former:
 Schmidt's Girls College (formerly in Jordanian East Jerusalem, now in Israeli-controlled East Jerusalem)

Kenya
 Alliance Girls High School
 Bishop Gatimu Ngandu Girls High School
 Daraja Academy
 The Green Garden Girls High School of The Green Garden Schools
 Kenya High School
 Kianda School
 Loreto High School, Limuru
 Lwak Girls' High School
 Muthale Girls' High School
 Ngara Girls' High School
 Ng'iya Girls High School
 Ondati Girls Secondary School
 Serare School (girls' high school)
 Starehe Girls' Centre

North Korea
 Chung Eui Girls' High School

South Korea
 Busan
 Dongnae Girls' High School
 Daegu
 Daegu Hyehwa Girls' High School
 Youngsong Girls' High School
 Incheon
 Incheon Nonhyeon High School (all girls from 2011)
 Myeongsin Girl's High School
 Gyeonggi Province
 Youngshin Girls' High School (Suwon)
 Jeju Province
 Branksome Hall Asia
 Sejong City
 Chochiwon Girls' High School
 Seoul
 Bosung Girls' High School
 Chungshin Girls' High School
 Eunkwang Girls' High School
 Ewha Girls' High School
 Ewha Girls' Foreign Language High School
 Jinmyeong Girls' High School
 Jinseon Girls' High School
 
 Sehwa Girls' High School
 Seoul Girls' High School
 Sookmyung Girls' High School
 Youngpa Girls' High School
 South Chungcheong Province
 Bugil Girls' High School
 Cheonan Girls' High School

Macau
 Nossa Senhora de Fátima
 Our Lady of Fatima Girls' School (Escola Nossa Senhora de Fátima; 化地瑪聖母女子學校)

Malaysia
 Johor
 Sekolah Tun Fatimah
 Kuala Lumpur
 Bukit Bintang Girls' School
 Convent Bukit Nanas
 St. Mary's School, Kuala Lumpur
 Sekolah Menengah Kebangsaan Puteri Wilayah
 SMS Seri Puteri
 Negeri Sembilan
 Kolej Tunku Kurshiah
 Penang
 Convent Datuk Keramat
 St. George's Girls' School
 Perak
 Convent Taiping
 Henry Gurney School, Batu Gajah
 Methodist Girls' School, Ipoh
 SMK Main Convent, Ipoh
 Treacher Methodist Girls' School
 Sabah
 Henry Gurney School, Kota Kinabalu
 Selangor
 Methodist Girls' School, Klang
 Sekolah Seri Puteri (Cyberjaya)

Mauritius
 Cosmopolitan College (Girls)
 Ebène State Secondary School (Girls)
 Madad Ul Islam Girls' College
 Queen Elizabeth College, Mauritius
 Windsor College Girls

Mexico
 Liceo de Monterrey (girls)

Irish Institute in the State of Mexico has a separate campus for girls.

Universidad Panamericana Preparatoria in Mexico City has a separate campus for girls.

Myanmar (Burma)
 Basic Education High School No. 2 Latha
 Basic Education High School No. 2 Sanchaung
 Basic Education High School No. 3 Dagon, formerly Myoms Girls National High School
 Basic Education High School No. 4 Botataung
 Mandalay
 Basic Education High School No. 8 Mandalay

New Zealand
 Auckland Region
 Carmel College, Auckland
 Diocesan School for Girls, Auckland
 Kelston Girls' College
 St Cuthbert's College, Auckland
 Westlake Girls High School
 Bay of Plenty Region
 Rotorua Girls' High School
 Canterbury
 Christchurch Girls' High School
 Rangi Ruru Girls' School (Christchurch)
 St Margaret's College, Christchurch
 Timaru Girls' High School
 Saint Kentigern College has gender separation in some classes
 Hawke's Bay Region
 Iona College, Havelock North
 Napier Girls' High School
 Marlborough Region
 Marlborough Girls' College (Blenheim)
 Manawatū-Whanganui
 Nga Tawa Diocesan School (Marton)
 Palmerston North Girls' High School
 Otago
 Columba College (Dunedin) (has mixed sex primary school and girls' only secondary levels)
 Otago Girls' High School (Dunedin)
 St Hilda's Collegiate School (Dunedin)
 Waitaki Girls' High School (Oamaru)
 Taranaki
 New Plymouth Girls' High School
 Sacred Heart Girls' College, New Plymouth
 Waikato
 Hamilton Girls' High School
 Waikato Diocesan School (Hamilton)
 Wellington Region
 Queen Margaret College, Wellington
 Samuel Marsden Collegiate School (Wellington)
 St Matthew's Collegiate School (Masterton)
 St Oran's College (years 7-13) (Boulcott, Lower Hutt)
 Wellington Girls' College
 Wellington East Girls' College
 ???
 Craighead Diocesan School
 Saint Kentigern School for Girls
 Selwyn House
 Taranaki Diocesan School for Girls 
 Woodford House

Nigeria

Abuja 

 Anglican Girls Grammar School, Abuja

Delta State 

 Our Ladys' High School, Effurun

 Edo State

 Anglican Girls Grammar School, Benin City
 Federal Government Girls College, Benin City
 Presentation National High School
 Enugu State
 Holy Rosary College, Enugu
 Imo State
 Federal Government Girls' College, Owerri
 Kwara State
 Federal Government Girls College Omu-Aran
 Lagos State
 Anwar ul-Islam Girls High School
 Holy Child College
 Lagoon Secondary School, Lekki
 Methodist Girls' High School
 Queen's College, Lagos
 Vivian Fowler Memorial College for Girls
 Niger State
 Federal Government Girls College Bida
 Ogun State
 Baptist Girls College
 Osun State
 Federal Government Girls College, Ipetumodu
 Rivers State
 Archdeacon Crowther Memorial Girls' School (Port Harcourt)
 Federal Government Girls' College, Abuloma (Abuloma)
 Holy Rosary College (Port Harcourt)
 Methodist Girls High School (Port Harcourt)
 Our Lady of Fatima College (Port Harcourt)

Pakistan
 Balochistan
 St. Joseph's Convent School, Quetta
 Punjab
 Convent of Jesus and Mary, Lahore
 Convent of Jesus and Mary, Murree
 Esena Foundation High School (Lahore)
 Presentation Convent Girls High School (Rawalpindi)
 Presentation Convent School, Jhelum Girls' Campus (Jhelum)
 Sacred Heart High School for Girls (Lahore)
 Sindh
 AES School for Girls (Karachi)
 Convent of Jesus and Mary, Karachi (Girls' only from class 6 onwards)
 Mama Parsi Girls Secondary School
 St Joseph's Convent School, Karachi
 St. Lawrence's Girls School, Karachi
 St Mary's Convent High School, Hyderabad

Palestine
Note that Schmidt's Girls College is in East Jerusalem which is under Israel control and is claimed by Palestine.

Peru
 Colegio Villa María (Lima)
 San Silvestre School (Lima)

Philippines

 Immaculate Concepcion Academy 
 Assumption Colleges 
 Metro Manila
 Assumption College San Lorenzo (Makati City)
 Concordia College (Manila)
 Colegio de Santa Rosa - Makati
 Holy Family School of Quezon City
 Immaculate Conception Academy–Greenhills (San Juan)
 Miriam College (Quezon City)
 PAREF Woodrose School (Mutinlupa City)
 Saint Pedro Poveda College (Quezon City)
 St. Scholastica's Academy of Marikina
 St. Scholastica's College, Manila
 Rizal
 Assumption Antipolo
 PAREF Rosehill School (Antipolo)
 Became coeducational
 Colegio de la Inmaculada Concepcion
 Closed
 Real Colegio de Santa Potenciana

Qatar
 Former
 Cambridge International School for Girls School (now coeducational, as Cambridge International School, Doha)

Sierra Leone
 Ansarul Islamic Girls Secondary School
 Koidu Girls Secondary School
 Nelson Mandela High School, Sierra Leone
 Annie Walsh Memorial School

Singapore
Secondary girls’ schools
 Cedar Girls' Secondary School
 CHIJ Katong Convent
 CHIJ Saint Joseph's Convent
 CHIJ Saint Nicholas Girls' School
 CHIJ Saint Theresa's Convent
 CHIJ Secondary (Toa Payoh)
 Crescent Girls' School
 Methodist Girls' School, Singapore
 Nanyang Girls' High School
 Paya Lebar Methodist Girls' School (Secondary)
 Raffles Girls' School (Secondary)
 Saint Anthony's Canossian Secondary School
 Singapore Chinese Girls' School
 St. Margaret's Secondary School
 Singapore Chinese Girls' School
 Tanjong Katong Girls' School

South Africa
 Eastern Cape
 Clarendon High School for Girls (East London)
 Diocesan School for Girls, Grahamstown
 Free State
 Eunice High School (Bloemfontein)
 Rosenhof High School
 Gauteng
 Afrikaanse Hoër Meisieskool
 Germiston High School
 Jeppe High School for Girls
 Kingsmead College
 Loreto Convent School, Pretoria
 Parktown High School for Girls
 Pretoria High School for Girls
 Roedean School (South Africa)
 St. Andrew's School for Girls
 St Dominic's Catholic School for Girls, Boksburg
 St. Mary's Diocesan School for Girls, Pretoria
 St Mary's School, Waverley
 St Stithians College has separate schools for girls
 Waverley Girls' High School
 Oprah Winfrey Leadership Academy for Girls (Henley on Klip)
 KwaZulu-Natal
 Durban Girls' College
 Durban Girls' High School
 Epworth School
 Kimberley Girls' High School
 Maris Stella School
 Pietermaritzburg Girls' High School
 Pinetown Girls' High School
 Queensburgh Girls' High School
 St. Anne's Diocesan College
 St. John's Diocesan School for Girls (Pietermaritzburg)
 St. Mary's Diocesan School for Girls, Kloof
 Westville Girls' High School
 The Wykeham Collegiate
 Western Cape
 Herschel Girls' School
 La Rochelle Girls' High School
 Rhenish Girls' High School
 Rustenburg School for Girls (Cape Town)
 St. Cyprian's School, Cape Town
 Wynberg Girls' High School

Spain
 Community of Madrid
 Union-Chrétienne de Saint Chaumond (Unión Cristiana de Saint Chaumond) (Madrid)

 Former
 Real Colegio de Doncellas Nobles

Sweden

 Former
 Åhlinska skolan
 Askersunds flickskola
 Fruntimmersföreningens flickskola
 Hammarstedtska skolan
 Kjellbergska flickskolan
 Klosterskolan (Uppsala)
 Malmö högre läroverk för flickor
 Marianne Ehrenströms flickskola
 Risbergska skolan
 Royal Seminary
 Rudbeckii flickskola
 Societetsskolan
 Storckenfeldtska skolan
 Tapetskolan vid Karlberg
 Uppsala högre elementarläroverk för flickor
 Wallinska skolan

Switzerland 
 Institut Villa Pierrefeu
 Surval Montreux
 Former
 Bäuerinnenschule
 Institut Alpin Videmanette

Taiwan (Republic of China)
 Hsinchu
 National Hsinchu Girls' Senior High School
 Kaohsiung
 Kaohsiung Municipal Kaohsiung Girls' Senior High School
 Tainan
 National Tainan Girls' Senior High School
 Sheng Kung Girls' High School
 Taipei
 Sacred Heart Girls High School (Taipei)
 Taipei First Girls' High School
 Taipei Municipal Zhongshan Girls High School

Tanzania
 Kilakala Girls High School (Morogoro)
 Weruweru Secondary School

Thailand
 Bangkok
 Assumption Convent School (Thailand)
 Assumption Suksa School
 Mahaprutharam Girls' School
 Mater Dei School (Thailand)
 Satri Si Suriyothai School
 Wattana Wittaya Academy
 Nakhon Ratchasima Province
 Suranaree School (Nakhon Ratchasima)

Previously girls' schools:
 Sacred Heart Convent School (Thailand)

Turkey
 
 Became coeducational
 American Collegiate Institute (Izmir, formerly Smyrna)
 American Academy for Girls (now Üsküdar American Academy) (Istanbul, formerly Constantinople)
 Closed
 Istanbul Girls High School
 Zappeion (Constantinople, now Istanbul) - Established in 1875, it was a school for girls catering to the Greek population. , an ethnic Turk, attended this school. Johann Strauss, author of "Language and power in the late Ottoman Empire," described it as "prestigious".

Uganda
 Tororo Girls School

United Arab Emirates
 Abu Dhabi
 Umm Habiba Girls School
 Dubai
 Latifa School for Girls

United Kingdom

United States

Vietnam
 Formerly all girls
 Marie Curie High School (Ho Chi Minh City)

Zambia
 Banani International Secondary School
 Ndola Girls Technical High School
 Munali Girls School

Zimbabwe
 Harare
 Arundel School
 Bishopslea Preparatory School
 Chisipite Senior School
 Dominican Convent High School, Harare
 Girls High School, Harare
 Bulawayo
 Dominican Convent Primary School, Bulawayo
 Dominican Convent High School, Bulawayo
 Girls' College
 Other
 Monte Cassino Girls High School
 Peterhouse Girls' School
 St Dominic's Chishawasha

By former countries

Ottoman Empire

 Aidin Vilayet
 American Collegiate Institute (Smyrna, now Izmir)
 Constantinople Vilayet
 American Academy for Girls (now Üsküdar American Academy) (Constantinople, now Istanbul)
 Zappeion (Constantinople, now Istanbul) - Established in 1875, it was a school for girls catering to the Greek population. , an ethnic Turk, attended this school. Johann Strauss, author of "Language and power in the late Ottoman Empire," described it as "prestigious".
 Mutasarrifate of Jerusalem
 Schmidt's Girls College (now in East Jerusalem, under Israeli administration)

See also
 Lists of boys' schools
 High School Girls (Japanese comic series)

References